Columbia Park is a park located in north Portland, Oregon, United States.

History
The city of Albina purchased the land in 1891, prior to its annexation by the city of Portland. In 1909 G.H. Hoch, head gardener for Washington Park, oversaw the design, which he "patterned ... after a famous park in Berlin."

See also

 List of parks in Portland, Oregon

References

External links
 

1891 establishments in Oregon
Parks in Portland, Oregon
Portsmouth, Portland, Oregon
Protected areas established in 1891